Daphnella lyonsi, common name the sieve daphnella, is a species of sea snail, a marine gastropod mollusk in the family Raphitomidae.

Description
The length of the shell attains 11 mm.

Distribution
This species occurs in the Caribbean Sea off Cuba and the Virgin Islands

References

 Espinosa J. & Fernández-Garcés R. (1990). El género Daphnella (Mollusca: Neogastropoda) en Cuba. Descripción de nuevas especies. Poeyana. 396: 1-16.

External links
 Gastropods.com: Daphnella lyonsi
 

lyonsi
Gastropods described in 1990